The Great Kiwi Bake Off Celebrity Special is a series of special Christmas-themed episodes of The Great Kiwi Bake Off that aired between 23 December 2019  and 22 December 2022. Each episode features six celebrities competing in two Bake Off challenges.  For the 2019 edition, the winner won NZ$30,000 for the charity of their choice. 

The 2019 edition was won by Jackie van Beek. The 2021 edition was won by Josh Thomson. 

The 2022 edition was won by Bree Tomasel.

The 2022 Christmas Special screened on TVNZ 1, on Tuesday, 20 December 2022, and was won by Siouxie Wiles.

The Great Kiwi Bake Off Celebrity Special 2019

Bakers

Bakes
In this Celebrity edition, the prize money totalled NZ$61,000. The celebrity bakers competed in honour of their chosen charity. At the start of the competition, each baker received NZ$2,000 for their charity.

For the technical challenge set by Sue, the celebrity bakers had one hour and forty-five minutes to bake 12 sweet ginger kisses. The winner of the technical would receive NZ$10,000.

For the showstopper challenge, the celebrity bakers had to bake a 3-D biscuit scene based on a Christmas memory in three hours. While no prize was directly awarded for the showstopper challenge, the celebrity bakers could also win spot prizes for creativity and other novelty awards.

 Art won NZ$1,500 for "Most Surprising Combination of Biscuit & Liquid." 
 Paula won NZ$1,500 for "Best Death by Biscuit."
 Jackie won NZ$1,500 for "Spinning the Longest Yarn." 
 Bree won NZ$750 for "Best Gingerbreast Woman" and NZ$750 for "Best New Zealand-Based Australian Celebrity Baker in the Celebrity Bake Off." 
 David won NZ$750 for the "Sound Design Award" and NZ$750 for the "Most Mysterious Use of a Mysterious Bag", which he gave to Jackie & Women's Refuge. 
 Toni won NZ$1,500 for "Best Lighting Design."

Jackie won the overall competition and won NZ$30,000.

The Great Kiwi Bake Off Celebrity Special 2021

Bakers

Bakes
In the 2021 Celebrity Special, the prize money totalled NZ$50,000.  At the start of the competition, each celebrity baker received NZ$1,000 for their charity.

For the technical challenge set by Sue, the celebrity bakers had one and a half hours to bake 12 festive cupcake snow people. The winner of the technical would receive NZ$10,000.

For the showstopper challenge, the celebrity bakers had to bake a Christmas-themed selfie cake in three hours. The winner of the showstopper would receive NZ$20,000. While no prize was directly awarded for the showstopper challenge, the celebrity bakers could also win spot prizes for creativity and other novelty awards.  

 Francis won NZ$1,000 for complimenting the co-hosts' dress sense and NZ$1,500 for calling his wife for assistance.
 Josh won NZ$1,000 for the most fun cupcakes and NZ$1,500 for sharing a personal reflection. 
 Justine won NZ$1,000 for the worst cupcakes and NZ$1,500 for dropping a cake onto the floor.
 Laura won NZ$1,000 for her sculpting skills and NZ$1,500 for the best selfie redemption.
 Rebekah won NZ$1,500 for her acting as an "amateur baker."
 Simon won NZ$1,000 for putting on a Green Party sweater and NZ$1,500 for the amount of his lollies the co-hosts had consumed.

Rebekah Randell won the technical challenge, and won a total of NZ$12,500 for her charity.

Josh Thompson was awarded star baker, and won a total of NZ$23,500 for his charity.

The Great Kiwi Bake Off Celebrity Special 2022

Bakers

Bakes
For the 2022 Celebrity Special, the prize money totalled NZ$25,000. At the start of the competition, each celebrity baker received NZ$1,000 for their charity.

For the technical challenge set by Jordan, the celebrity bakers had one and a half hours to bake Prosecco & Pear Cake. The winner of the technical challenge would receive NZ$7,000.

For the showstopper challenge, the celebrity bakers had to bake a three-dimension Celebrity Treasure Island moment biscuit in three hours. The winner of the showstopper would receive NZ$12,000. 

Courtenay Louise won the technical challenge and won a total of NZ$8,000 for her charity.

Bree Tomasel was awarded star baker and won a total of NZ$13,000 for her charity. She later donated NZ$1,000 to other 5 celebrities from her winning.

The Great Kiwi Bake Off Celebrity Christmas Special 2022

This programme screened on Tuesday, 20 December 2022. The prize money totalled NZ$25,000. At the start of the competition, each celebrity baker received NZ$1,000 for their charity.

For the technical challenge set by Peter, the celebrity bakers had one and a half hours to bake Christmas muffins, made according to his recipe. The winner of the technical challenge would receive NZ$7,000.

For the showstopper challenge, the celebrity bakers had to bake a Christmas scene, with at least 50% of it containing meringue, in three hours. The winner of the showstopper would receive NZ$12,000.

David Correos won the technical challenge and won a total of NZ$8,000 for his charity.

Siouxsie Wiles was awarded star baker and won a total of NZ$13,000 for her charity.

Bakers

Bakes

References

TVNZ 2 original programming
2019 New Zealand television seasons